Vakuta is an island in the Trobriand Islands group of Papua New Guinea.

At the census of population in 2000, Vakuta had a population of 971.

References
Vakuta at WikiMapia

Trobriand Islands
Islands of Milne Bay Province